HSC Condor Voyager is a high-speed catamaran cruise ferry, owned by Brittany Ferries and chartered to Condor Ferries. Since being built in 2000, the vessel has borne the names Incat Tasmania, The Lynx and Normandie Express. She is designed to travel at speeds of up to 46-and-a-half knots, giving a journey time between Portsmouth and the Normandy ports of three hours per crossing.

History
Brittany Ferries purchased the Normandie Express from Incat in 2007, having been on charter from them since 2005.  She was built as Incat Tasmania at the Incat yards in Tasmania, Australia.  Her first use was on charter to the Australian Trade Commission as a floating conference centre during the 2000 Summer Olympics in Sydney. Later that year, she was chartered to Tranz Rail for its Interislander service between Picton and Wellington.  She was renamed The Lynx for this service and remained on the route until 2003 when she was returned to Incat.

Europe
In September 2004, P&O Ferries announced it was to withdraw their services from Portsmouth to France, Brittany Ferries later announced it would run a fastcraft service between Portsmouth and Cherbourg/Caen (Ouistreham) as a replacement and The Lynx was chartered.  In January 2005, she was renamed Normandie Express and sailed for France, stopping off in Indonesia to drop off supplies and equipment for the tsunami relief effort.

Also on board for the trip to Europe was the French yacht Sill et Veolia which was being returned to France after being damaged whilst on the Vendée Globe round-the-world yacht race.  After calling in at Roscoff to drop off the yacht and being shown off to Brittany Ferries management, she undertook berthing trials in Portsmouth, Cherbourg and Ouistreham before starting service in March 2005.

For her first year in service with Brittany Ferries, Normandie Express had a bridge and engine room crew supplied by Northern Marine and was registered in Nassau but protests from French trade unions meant that from 2006 she would fly the French flag and be registered in Caen with a full French crew.

Routes
In mid 2012, Brittany Ferries announced that Normandie Express would no longer operate the Portsmouth to Caen Route in 2013. Instead, a brand new route was officially introduced, sailing from Portsmouth to Le Havre from May until September, but only on Thursdays and Fridays.

From 2021, Condor Ferries announced that Condor Voyager would operate the Channel Islands to St Malo service with a further commute to Poole replacing the now sold Condor Rapide.

References

External links
Condor Ferries

Ships built by Incat
Ferries of the United Kingdom
Ferries of France
Cook Strait ferries
Incat high-speed craft
2000 ships